Ishqiya is a 2010 Indian black comedy film starring Vidya Balan, Naseeruddin Shah, Arshad Warsi and Salman Shahid. It was directed by Abhishek Chaubey in his directorial debut, cinematography by Mohana Krishna, and was produced by Raman Maroo and Vishal Bhardwaj. The film was released on 29 January 2010.

The film performed moderately at the box office. It was selected for screening at the 34th Cairo International Film Festival. A sequel Dedh Ishqiya was released in January 2014 with the same cast and crew, sans Vidya Balan, who was substituted by Madhuri Dixit and Huma Qureshi.

Plot
Ishqiya starts with Krishna Verma (Vidya Balan) trying to convince her husband, Vidyadhar Verma (Adil Hussain), a local gang-lord, that he should surrender. He agrees but is soon killed in a gas explosion. Two criminals, Iftikhar aka Khalujan (Naseeruddin Shah) and Razzak Hussain aka Babban (Arshad Warsi), botch up a job and escape from the clutches of their boss, Mushtaq (Salman Shahid), who wants to bury them alive. They land up in Gorakhpur in Uttar Pradesh to seek refuge in the house of Vidyadhar Verma.

Instead, they meet his widow Krishna, who gives them shelter and tries to seduce them to achieve her own secret goal. She proposes the kidnapping of Kamalkant Kakkar aka KK (Rajesh Sharma), a small businessman. The duo reluctantly agree, since they want to escape the clutches of Mushtaq. Meanwhile, Khalujan and Babban realise that they are falling for Krishna, but they do not reveal their feelings to each other. Babban eventually seduces Krishna and both have sex. Khalujan decides to tell his feelings to Krishna but is shocked when he sees Krishna and Babban together dancing after having sex. Khalujan is angry but keeps quiet. However, when the kidnapping does not go as smoothly as wanted, Khalujan and Babban start fighting.

Meanwhile, Krishna tortures KK and asks him where her husband is hiding, revealing that Verma might be alive. KK finally calls Verma. Babban and Khalujan realise that Krishna was just using them. They confront her, whereupon she reveals that KK and Verma were partners in the illegal business and that Verma is still alive. The duo reach KK's factory and are shocked to find Verma. Verma's goons blindfold the duo and take them to a deserted spot. When they take out their blindfolds, Babban sees Nandu (Alok Kumar), a boy he had previously met, pointing a gun at them. Nandu leaves them alive and explains the whole story. He tells that Verma had no plans to leave his criminal life, so he faked his death in front of the world, to get two benefits, getting rid of his wife by killing her in explosion and faking his death so he can start a new life with new identity as police was after him. Khalujan and Babban race back to Krishna's house, where they have left her tied to a chair.

Meanwhile, Krishna succeeds in opening the tube of gas cylinder, causing a leak. Verma confronts her and she tries to kill them by igniting a lighter. Verma assaults Krishna while the duo arrives. Soon, police arrive at the scene, too. Verma's goons are killed in a shootout, while Verma is killed in a gas explosion. The duo save Krishna and soon the trio is seen walking away from the burning house.

Unknown to them, Mushtaq is pointing a gun at them. Suddenly Mushtaq's wife calls. The trio are still seen through the gun hole of Mushtaq, making their fate unclear, although it can be assumed that Mushtaq left them alive.

Cast 
 Vidya Balan as Krishna Verma
 Naseeruddin Shah as Khalujan/Khalu/Iftikhar
 Arshad Warsi as Razzak Hussain aka Babban 
 Salman Shahid as Mushtaq Bhai
 Adil Hussain as Vidyadhar Verma/Shyam Prasad Kulshreshtha
 Rajesh Sharma as Kamalkant Kakkar
 Anupama Kumar as Manju Kakkar
 Gauri Malla as Mamta
 Alok Aarav as Nandu
 Anisa Bano as Tai

Soundtrack 

The soundtrack of the film was composed by Vishal Bhardwaj and the lyrics are penned by Gulzar. The music was released on 1 January 2010. The reception to the music has been positive with "Dil To Bachcha Hai" and "Ibn-E-Batuta" being instant chartbusters. The track "Badi Dheere Jali", based on an Indian classical raaga "Lalit" and the ghazal "Ab Mujhe Koi" are sung by Rekha Bhardwaj.

Track listing

Reception

Box office 
In three days, the gross box office collections of the film in India crossed Rs. 150 million on 522 screens. Friday morning shows opened with 40–60 percent in key areas like Delhi, Lucknow, Mumbai and Pune evening settled down to 65–70 percent with average occupancy cultivating first day gross box office of Rs. 38.5 million. With glowing reviews ranging from 3–4 star ratings and strong word-of-mouth from audience, Saturday showed an impressive jump of 25–30 percent and settled down to Rs. 50 million; Sunday showed further jump of 30 percent compared to Friday and 8–10 percent compared to Saturday, garnered a further Rs. 54 million to cumulate an opening gross weekend collection of more than Rs. 140 million at the box office. After five weeks Ishqiya grossed Rs. and was declared an above average performer at the box office.

Critical reception 
Anupama Chopra of NDTV wrote, "Ishqiya would have faltered if the performances had not matched the writing but all three leads are absolutely terrific," while giving the movie 3.5 stars out of 5. Rajeev Masand of CNN-IBN while giving it 3.5 on a 5-star rating, called it, "a delicious little film that teeters dangerously between saucy comedy and suspenseful noir....the film sparkles for its inspired writing and uncompromised direction." Pratim D. Gupta of The Telegraph called Ishqiya "a rollercoaster rustic ride through ishq aaj kal" and praised director Abhishek Chaubey calling his "one of the most assured debuts in recent Hindi cinema." Noyon Jyoti Parasara of AOL gave 4 out of 5 stars and said, "Ishqiya could have been an average film had it not been for the screenplay." The Indiatimes review also gave 3.5 stars out of 5. Taran Adarsh of bollywood hungama while giving the film 4 on a 5 star rating scale, said "You can't help but fall in ishq with Ishqiya. Tired of sherbat? Try this spicy jaljeera for a change!"

Accolades

Sequel
At a private party, the producers of Ishqiya, Shemaroo and Vishal Bhardwaj, announced the sequel, Dedh Ishqiya, with the same cast and crew.
In April 2012, Madhuri Dixit signed on for the sequel of Ishqiya, her first film after moving back to the country in November 2011 to play a grey character called Shahi Begum. The two male leads Naseeruddin Shah and Arshad Warsi were retained from the original. The role of supporting actress first was offered to Asin Thottumkal but, she refused to work in a supporting role in Dedh Ishqiya and in one interview she said that she thought that her role is not very attractive so, she left the project. Kangana Ranaut then signed Dedh Ishqiya and said she was going to start shooting soon. But in December 2012 she opted out due to date issues. Huma Qureshi replaced Kangna Ranaut. Arshad Warsi stated that he was paired with Huma and Madhuri was paired opposite Naseeruddin Shah.

The shooting was initially to start in September and was shifted to November later, but it was postponed even further. The shooting of Dedh Ishqiya began on 27 February 2013. The Mahmudabad palace near Barabanki was spruced up for the shoot. Madhuri Dixit performed mujra to a song titled Apne Karar Mein. Pandit Birju Maharaj choreographed the dance sequence for Madhuri Dixit for the film. First look of the film was released on 25 October 2013, trailer got released on 8 November, and the film has released worldwide on 10 January 2014, with 1200 screens in India.

See also
Bollywood films of 2010

Notes

References

External links

2010 films
2010s Hindi-language films
2010 comedy-drama films
Indian comedy-drama films
Indian black comedy films
Films set in Uttar Pradesh
Films about women in India
Films scored by Vishal Bhardwaj
Films that won the Best Audiography National Film Award
Films with screenplays by Sabrina Dhawan
2010 black comedy films
2010 directorial debut films